John Rooney (born January 30, 1954) is an American sportscaster, currently best known as a play-by-play announcer for radio broadcasts of Major League Baseball's St. Louis Cardinals.

Early career
A Richmond, Missouri, native, Rooney began his broadcast career in the 1970s, doing a number of assignments for various radio stations in Missouri and Oklahoma. In 1980, he began calling play-by-play for the Oklahoma City 89ers, a minor league baseball team. He broadcast for the Louisville Redbirds beginning in 1983. He also called Missouri Tigers men's basketball for many years and did Chicago Bulls radio from 1989–1991.

Major League Baseball career
Rooney broadcast for the Minnesota Twins in the mid-1980s. In 1988, he joined the Chicago White Sox' television crew; the following year, he switched to the team's radio booth, where he teamed up with Wayne Hagin (1989–1991) and Ed Farmer (1992–2005).

In September 2005, it was announced that Rooney would be leaving the White Sox' radio crew after 18 years, due to a salary dispute with their new flagship station. His final broadcast with the team was Game 4 of the 2005 World Series, which ended in the White Sox' first Series championship since 1917. The following season, he joined the Cardinals' radio crew on KTRS, teaming with former player and veteran broadcaster Mike Shannon. The Cardinals won the 2006 World Series, so Rooney called successive championship seasons for different teams, a major league first.

National work
Rooney worked for CBS Radio from 1984–2003, nationally broadcasting various sports events including Major League Baseball, the National Football League, college football, and college basketball. He called Saturday baseball telecasts for Fox Sports from 1996 to 1998, and postseason Division Series games for ESPN Radio in 2003 and 2004, as well as NFL games on the Sports USA Radio Network. In 2004, he was inducted into the Missouri Sports Hall of Fame.

Catchphrases
Rooney punctuates team victories with a catchphrase: "That's a Redbirds/White Sox winner!" His signature home run call is "It's a goner!". When the leadoff batter is due up first in later innings, he says'' “top of the order to you”.

References 

1954 births
Living people
American radio sports announcers
American television sports announcers
Chicago Bears announcers
Chicago Bulls announcers
Chicago White Sox announcers
College basketball announcers in the United States
College football announcers
Major League Baseball broadcasters
Minnesota Twins announcers
Minor League Baseball broadcasters
Missouri Tigers men's basketball announcers
National Basketball Association broadcasters
National Football League announcers
People from Richmond, Missouri
St. Louis Cardinals announcers